Alfredo Álvarez Calderón (19 December 1918 – 25 February 2001) was a Peruvian diver. He competed in the men's 3 metre springboard event at the 1936 Summer Olympics.

References

External links
 

1918 births
2001 deaths
Peruvian male divers
Olympic divers of Peru
Divers at the 1936 Summer Olympics
Sportspeople from Lima
20th-century Peruvian people
21st-century Peruvian people